Laharrague is a Basque surname. Notable people with the surname include:

Julien Laharrague (born 1978), French rugby union player
Nicolas Laharrague (born 1981), French rugby union player

Basque-language surnames